{{DISPLAYTITLE:C2532H3854N672O711S16}}
The molecular formula C2532H3854N672O711S16 (molar mass: 55597.4 g/mol) may refer to:

 Alglucerase
 Imiglucerase